Charles Hanson may refer to:

 Sir Charles Hanson, 1st Baronet (1846–1921), MP for Bodmin in Cornwall
 Sir Charles Hanson, 2nd Baronet (1874–1958), Lord Lieutenant of the City of London, and High Sheriff of Cornwall
 Charles E. Hanson (1855–1932), Wisconsin State Assemblyman
 Charles Hanson (auctioneer) (born 1978), auctioneer and television personality

See also
 Charles Hansen (disambiguation)
 Charlie Hanson, British producer and director
 Hanson (surname)